Jaipur Jewellery Show (JJS) is a B2B & B2C Jewellery trade fair held annually in December (also known as the December Show) at the Jaipur Exhibition & Convention Centre (JECC), Jaipur. It was first held in December, 2004 and has since then it is being continuously held on an annual basis.

JJS History 
The first edition of JJS was hosted in 2004. The show hosts a different theme each year based on different types of gemstones and forms of jewellery. For example, in the inaugural year 2004, the theme was "Redefining Colors".  The last two editions of "The December Show" had the theme "Ruby- Red, Rare, Royal".

TV series based on the show
Six episodes of JJS show regarding the jewellery trade of Jaipur telecasted on NDTV Good Times, prior to the 13th edition of the Jaipur Jewellery Show in December, where JJS's brand Ambassador – Amrita Rao, Bollywood actress was seen wearing the jewellery designs of the participating brands of Jaipur and interviewed the jewellery brand owners and designers.

Theme of JJS - 2015
JJS-2015 was having the theme RUBY – Red | Rare | Royal. Savio Jewelry's peacock ring was a displayed in JJS, holding a world record for the most number of diamonds in a single ring. Rajasthan's CM Vasundhara Raje inaugurated the show whereas Amrita Rao was the brand ambassador of the show. Sharmila Tagore and Soha Ali Khan were also present at various promotional events.

Theme of JJS - 2021 
JJS - 2021 is having the theme of "It's time to sparkle". It is inaugurated by Chief Guest- Shri Amit Yadav, IAS, Director General, DGFT and Additional Secretary, Department of Commerce, Ministry of Commerce and Industry & Guest of Honor - Shri Ashish Pethe, Chairman, GJC and Shri Nirmal Kumar Bardiya, Regional Chairman - Rajasthan, GJEPC.

See also

References

External links

Jewellery show from Dec 24-27

Jewellery industry in India
Economy of Jaipur
Trade fairs in India